Utirik Airport is a public use airstrip on Utirik Island in Utirik Atoll, Marshall Islands. This airstrip is assigned the location identifier 03N by the FAA and UTK by the IATA.

Facilities 
Utirik Airport is at an elevation of 4 feet (1.2 m) above mean sea level. The runway is designated 07/25 with a coral gravel surface measuring 2,400 by 50 feet (732 x 15 m). There are no aircraft based at Utirik.

Airlines and destinations

References

External links 
AirNav airport information for 03N

Airports in the Marshall Islands